Joey Belladonna (born Joseph Bellardini; October 13, 1960) is an American singer, best known as the vocalist for thrash metal band Anthrax. He is also the vocalist and drummer of the cover band Chief Big Way. Belladonna has six Grammy Award nominations and is known for his wild, energetic stage behavior, and tenor vocal range.

Early life 
Belladonna was born in Oswego, New York. He is Italian-American on his father's side and Native American on his mother's side. In his youth, Belladonna looked up to bands such as the Beatles, Led Zeppelin, Kansas and Rush; bands that Belladonna said created "stuff that was very intricate but yet catchy and hooky you know, with great vocals."

Career

Bible Black 

In 1983, Belladonna, still using his birth name Joey Bellardini at the time, became the vocalist for the band Bible Black, founded by former Elf and Rainbow members, Craig Gruber and Gary Driscoll, and future Blue Cheer guitarist Andrew "Duck" MacDonald. Belladonna's predecessors in the band were Jeff Fenholt, who later had brief stints with Black Sabbath and Joshua, and Louis Marullo, aka Eric Adams, who left to join Manowar.  Belladonna recorded the songs "Deceiver" and "Midnight Dance" with Bible Black.  The band never officially released an album.

Anthrax 

Belladonna was the lead singer of Anthrax from 1984 to 1992, and was considered part of the classic-lineup (also featuring Dan Spitz, Scott Ian, Frank Bello and Charlie Benante).

After he was replaced by John Bush, he spent the next decade touring in minivans and taking odd jobs.

Belladonna returned to the band when the "classic" lineup reunited and toured during 2005 and 2006. He found out on the internet that he had been replaced again by Dan Nelson.

His voice has been featured on six studio albums and several EPs that have sold a total of eight million copies worldwide. During Belladonna's first tenure with Anthrax, the band was nominated for three Grammys, and he was voted the No. 1 metal singer two years in a row in Metal Forces magazine.

In early 2010, Belladonna officially rejoined Anthrax in time for the "Big Four" shows at the Sonisphere festival. Following these and other shows, Belladonna returned to the studio with the band to record new vocals for their long-awaited album Worship Music.

Since his return, Anthrax has been nominated for three additional Grammy awards.

Belladonna / solo career 
After his departure from Anthrax in 1992, Belladonna continued to make music in 'Belladonna', a solo project of which he has been the only consistent member.

In the mid-1990s, Belladonna released its self-titled debut album, which was well received by both critics and fans alike. The second album, Spells of Fear, was released in 1998 and was heavily criticized for bad production and poor musicianship. Demo recordings of a third album, which was never professionally mastered, was self-released by the band in 2003. It was a return to better songwriting and musicianship and like the debut album it was well received by the fans.

When asked whether he plans to release any more solo material in the future despite having re-joined Anthrax as a full-time member, Belladonna responded with: "Yeah definitely. I'm working on some stuff and I have almost a full record worth of material sitting right here which is very well demoed up but it is still far from done in its own way. I just keep running out of time whether someone's schedule is messed up or whatever it is happening at the time and it's unfortunate. Now of course Anthrax is back on the go so I just don't have the time to sit for hours with the material but there is definitely some cool metal here. By the time I get to do these songs I'll probably have a fresh batch of ideas and songs to put on top of those. (...) I'd like to put another record out some day, put something out that I can again call my own as I have some great ideas."

Belladonna also plays drums and sings lead vocals in a cover band named Chief Big Way which features mainly classic rock hits from the 1970s and 80s. The band, based around Syracuse, New York, plays small neighborhood bars.

Discography

Belladonna solo

Anthrax

EPs 
Armed and Dangerous (1985)
I'm the Man (1987) (includes live tracks)
Penikufesin (1989) (only released in Europe, collection of State of Euphoria sessions)
Attack of the Killer B's (1991) (promo release, includes live tracks)
Anthems (2013)

Compilation albums 
Fistful of Anthrax (1987) (only released in Japan, this is Fistful of Metal with two Joey Belladonna-fronted songs added)
Attack of the Killer B's (1991) (collection of live, rarities and previously unreleased material)
Moshers: 1986–1991 (1998) (import release)
Return of the Killer A's (1999)
Madhouse – The Very Best of Anthrax (2001)
The Collection (2002)
Universal Masters Collection (2002)
Anthrology: No Hit Wonders (1985–1991) (2005)
Sin-Atra (2011)

Live albums 
Live: The Island Years (1994) (recorded live in 1991 and 1992)
Alive 2 (2005)

VHS/DVDs 
US Speed Metal Attack (1986) (split video with Agent Steel and Overkill, recorded live in Germany)
Oidivnikufesin (1987) (recorded live at Hammersmith Odeon)
Through Time (1990)
Live Noize (1991) (recorded live on the Persistence of Time tour)
White Noise: The Videos (1994) (released only in Japan, complete collection of the Sound of White Noise music videos)
Return of the Killer A's (1999) (includes live performances of the Persistence of Time tour)
Rock Legends (2004)
Anthrax Anthralogy: The DVD (2005) (includes live performances)
Alive 2 (2005) (DVD version)

References

External links 

 Joey Belladonna on AllMusic

1960 births
Anthrax (American band) members
American heavy metal singers
20th-century American singers
21st-century American singers
American tenors
Living people
People from Oswego, New York
Singers from New York (state)
Thrash metal musicians
Waysted members
American people of Italian descent